Plesiotapirus is an extinct genus of tapir from the Miocene of Asia. A single species is usually considered valid, Plesiotapirus yagii.

It was first described in 1921 based on fragmentary dental remains found in Japan. Fossils of P. yagii were originally classified under the defunct genus Palaeotapirus. Better material, including a complete skull, were found in China and in 1991 the genus Plesiotapirus was erected.

References

Prehistoric tapirs
Miocene odd-toed ungulates
Miocene mammals of Asia